"It'll Be Me" is a song written by Jack Clement, first released in April 1957 by Jerry Lee Lewis, as B-side to his single "Whole Lot of Shakin' Going On" (Sun 267).

Jerry Lee Lewis
The song was written by Clement with the intention that it be the follow-up A-side to Jerry Lee Lewis' first local hit, "Crazy Arms".  According to Clement, "We were working on a song I'd written called "It'll Be Me", and I was in the control room and getting tired of it, so I went out there and said, 'Why don't we get off of this?  We'll come back to it later, Jerry.  Let's cut something else...'."  Band member J. W. Brown suggested that Lewis play another song that had been going down well in live performances, "Whole Lotta Shakin' Going On".  When the single was released, "It'll Be Me" was used as the B-side.

Another (slower and shorter) version of the song, from a later recording session, was released in May 1958 on his first album Jerry Lee Lewis.

Cliff Richard and the Shadows

Cliff Richard and the Shadows released their version as the A-side of a single in August 1962. It reached number 2 on the UK Singles Chart and was a top ten hit in numerous other countries. In 1983 Richard rerecorded the song for his 25th Anniversary album Rock 'n' Roll Silver (exclusive to the limited edition box-set Silver).

Chart performance

Other versions
Tom Jones recorded two studio versions of the song, one for his album Country, the other with Jools Holland (Tom Jones & Jools Holland album, 2004). Other versions are by Deep Purple, Gerry & The Pacemakers, The Move (Something Else from The Move, 1968), Johnny Cymbal, Les Carle, Bobby Vee, Johnny Winter, Paul Rishell and Janis Martin.

References

External links
Secondhandsongs.com
Nashvillesongwritersfoundation.com

Songs written by Jack Clement
Jerry Lee Lewis songs
1957 songs
1957 singles
Cliff Richard songs
Tom Jones (singer) songs
The Move songs
Sun Records singles
Song recordings produced by Norrie Paramor
Columbia Graphophone Company singles
Song recordings produced by Sam Phillips